"Yahooze" is a song by Nigerian recording artist Olu Maintain. It was produced by Puffy Tee and officially released on October 27, 2007, as the lead single  from his debut album of the same name. The music video for "Yahooze" was shot in Nigeria. The official remix features guest vocals from Nigerian recording artist LKT.
"Yahooze" won Hottest Single of the Year at the 2008 Nigeria Entertainment Awards.

Performances
According to an article posted on The Punch website, "Olu Maintain" performed "Yahooze" at the Royal Albert Hall, London and brought on stage Colin Powell, the former United States Secretary of State.

Accolades

Track listing
 Digital single

Release history

References

2007 singles
2007 songs
Olu Maintain songs
Yoruba-language songs